Keep On Pushin'  is an album by saxophonist Arnett Cobb which was recorded in 1984 and released on the Bee Hive label.

Reception

The AllMusic review by Scott Yanow stated, "Arnett Cobb, at 66, still had plenty of energy as he demonstrates on this Bee Hive LP. ... This is an excellent mainstream set  ".

Track listing

Personnel
Arnett Cobb – tenor saxophone
Joe Newman – trumpet (tracks 3 & 4)
Al Grey – trombone (tracks 3 & 4)
Junior Mance – piano
George Duvivier – bass
Panama Francis – drums

References

Arnett Cobb albums
1984 albums
Bee Hive Records albums
Albums produced by Bob Porter (record producer)